Ulu Pandan Single Member Constituency was a constituency in Singapore. It used to exist from 1959 to 1988 as Ulu Pandan Constituency and was renamed as Ulu Pandan Single Member Constituency (SMC) as part of Singapore's political reforms. The SMC was merged into Bukit Timah Group Representation Constituency in 1997.

Member of Parliament

Elections

Elections in the 1950s

Elections in the 1960s

Elections in the 1970s

Elections in the 1980s

References 

Singaporean electoral divisions